MBC Digital 3 is a Mauritian free-to-air television channel owned by the Mauritius Broadcasting Corporation and launched in March 1996. Its programming consists of news and cultural TV programmes.

See also 
 Kids Channel (Mauritian TV channel)
 MBC 1 (Mauritian TV channel)
 MBC 2 (Mauritian TV channel)
 BTV (Mauritius)

List of Shows Broadcast by the Mauritius Broadcasting Corporation

References

External links
 Official Schedule,^ Official MBC Digital 3 Website.

Television channels in Mauritius
Mauritius Broadcasting Corporation